Thomas Weld may refer to:

 Thomas Welde (1594/5–1661), first minister of the First Church of Roxbury, Massachusetts
 Thomas Weld (of Lulworth) (1750–1810), of Lulworth castle, Catholic philanthropist
 Thomas Weld (cardinal) (1773–1837), British Roman Catholic Cardinal